Cirrhipathes is a genus of black coral from the family Antipathidae. Coral species in this genus are commonly known as whip or wire corals because they often exhibit a twisted or coiled morphology. In addition to their colorful appearance, with colors ranging from yellow to red passing through blue and green, these species possess a dark skeleton that is characteristic to every black coral.

Distribution
Long and unbranched, Cirrhipathes species are attached to coral reefs.

Description
Like all corals, Cirrhipathes species are made of and covered by polyps. These polyps are responsible for providing defense and feeding mechanisms in the form of stinging structures known as nematocysts. These structures, which are present in their tentacles, are fired at preys or predators. The characteristic barbed-wire-like appearance of Cirrhipathes species is the result of their inability to completely retract their polyps. They can grow up to more than three meters in length.

Corals in this genus have different ways of obtaining nutrients. While some species obtain nutrients from their mutualistic interaction with photosynthetic zooxanthellae, others obtain their food by simply capturing small floating animals with their tentacles. In addition to this, wire corals being carnivorous organisms should be fed on small, meaty items such as baby brine, rotifers, cyclop-eeze, fish eggs, and other zooplankton feeds. 

From their interaction with the zooxanthellae, the Cirrhipathes obtain essential molecules and in return, protection and access to sunlight are provided to the zooxanthellae. Furthermore, important habitats that house numerous species of marine organisms are formed by these corals. It is even believed that the survival of two species of shrimp depends entirely on these corals.

References

Further reading
Gaino, Elda, and Francesca Scoccia. "Female gametes of the black coral Cirrhipathes cfr. anguina (Anthozoa, Antipatharia) from the Indonesian Marine Park of Bunaken." Invertebrate Reproduction & Development 51.3 (2008): 119–126.
Gaino, Elda, et al. "Sperm morphology in the black coral Cirrhipathes sp.(Anthozoa, Antipatharia)." Invertebrate Biology 127.3 (2008): 249–258.
Bavestrello, Giorgio, et al. "Helicospiral growth in the whip black coral Cirrhipathes sp.(Antipatharia, Antipathidae)." The Biological Bulletin 222.1 (2012): 17–25.
Wagner, Daniel, Daniel G. Luck, and Robert J. Toonen. "2 The Biology and Ecology of Black Corals (Cnidaria: Anthozoa: Hexacorallia: Antipatharia)."Advances in marine biology 63 (2012): 67.

External links

Advanced Aquarist - Black Corals

Antipathidae
Hexacorallia genera
Cnidarians of the Pacific Ocean
Cnidarians of the Indian Ocean
Marine fauna of Asia
Marine fauna of Oceania
Marine fauna of Southeast Asia